"Murphy's Law," is the name of a single by the Canadian/American female dance music duo Chéri.

Chart history
"Murphy's Law" went to number 1 Billboard Hot Dance Club Play Chart and reached the top spot in May 1982 where it stayed for three weeks. The single also reached number 5 on the soul chart, reached the UK top twenty (#13), and entered the Billboard Hot 100 chart, where it peaked at number 39.

Track listings
 7" (US)
A   Murphy's Law (Remix) (3:53) 
B   Murphy's Law (Instrumental) (3:51)

 12" (US)
A   Murphy's Law (6:42) 
B   Murphy's Law (6:27)

See also
List of number-one dance singles of 1982 (U.S.)

References

External links
Track listing at e.discogs.com
 

1982 singles
1982 songs
Polydor Records singles
Songs about loneliness